The 200/S class is a deep-sea patrol boat of the Italian Coast Guard, built by Rodriquez Cantieri Navali Group (Messina) (now Intermarine Group).

Features
The 200/S class patrol boats are characterised by high speed and excellent seaworthiness.  They have aluminium hulls and have been designed to comply with Italian Coast Guard requirements.  Propulsion is provided by two lateral diesel engines, each driving a fixed-pitch propeller, and by one central diesel engine couplet with a “booster” waterjet.  The boats are able to achieve a speed of 34 knots.  28 boats have been built.

Vessels

References

Ships built in Italy
Patrol boat classes
Corps of the Port Captaincies – Coast Guard